The 1995 Trans America Athletic Conference baseball tournament was held at Homestead Sports Complex in Homestead, Florida. This was the seventeenth tournament championship held by the Trans America Athletic Conference, in its seventeenth year of existence.  won their second tournament championship in three years, and first of three in a row, and earned the conference's automatic bid to the 1995 NCAA Division I baseball tournament.

Format and seeding
The top four finishers by conference winning percentage qualified for the tournament, with the top seed playing the lowest seed in the first round.

Bracket

All-Tournament Team
The following players were named to the All-Tournament Team.

Most Valuable Player
Todd Tocco was named Tournament Most Valuable Player. Tocco was a first baseman for UCF.

References

Tournament
ASUN Conference Baseball Tournament
Trans America Athletic Conference baseball tournament